The Carmarthen by-election, was held in Carmarthen, Wales, on 14 July 1966. The contest was significant in that it resulted in the election of Gwynfor Evans, the first ever Plaid Cymru Member of Parliament. Plaid Cymru's victory in the Carmarthen constituency, a seminal moment for Welsh nationalism, was part of a wider process toward Welsh devolution which eventually led to the establishment of the Welsh Assembly in 1999.

The election was caused by the death of Labour Party Member of Parliament Megan Lloyd George.

Gwynfor Evans' surprise win is credited with laying the foundations for Winnie Ewing's victory for the Scottish National Party at the 1967 Hamilton by-election, an event of equal significance for Scottish nationalism.

Results

See also 
 1882 Carmarthen Boroughs by-election
 1924 Carmarthen by-election
 1928 Carmarthen by-election
 1941 Carmarthen by-election
 1957 Carmarthen by-election
 Carmarthen (UK Parliament constituency)
 Royal Commission on the Constitution (United Kingdom)

References

External links
BBC – South East Wales – Hall of Fame – Gwynfor Evans
Election leaflet of Gwynfor Evans, Plaid Cymru candidate in the 1966 Carmarthen by-election
Welsh by-election results: 1833–1972
1966 – 67 By Elections

By-elections to the Parliament of the United Kingdom in Welsh constituencies
Plaid Cymru
Carmarthen by-election
Carmarthen by-election
Carmarthen by-election, 1966
Elections in Carmarthenshire
20th century in Carmarthenshire
Carmarthen by-election